NGC 7 is a barred spiral galaxy located in the Sculptor constellation. It was discovered by English astronomer John Herschel in 1834, who was using an 18.7 inch reflector telescope at the time. Astronomer Steve Gottlieb described the galaxy as faint, albeit large, and edge-on from the perspective of the Milky Way; he also noted how the galaxy could only be observed clearly with peripheral vision, not by looking directly at it.

References

External links

 

Galaxies discovered in 1834
0007
18340927
Discoveries by John Herschel
Sculptor (constellation)
Barred spiral galaxies